The Assistant Secretary of State for Consular Affairs is the head of the Bureau of Consular Affairs within the United States Department of State.  The Assistant Secretary of State for Consular Affairs reports to the Under Secretary of State for Management.  From 1953 to 1977, the position was called Administrator of the Bureau of Security and Consular Affairs. The bureau is "responsible for the welfare and protection of U.S. citizens abroad, for the issuance of passports and other documentation to citizens and nationals, and for the protection of U.S. border security and the facilitation of legitimate travel to the United States" as described by the bureau's website.

List of the Assistant Secretaries of State for Security and Consular Affairs, 1953—77

List of the Assistant Secretaries of State for Consular Affairs, 1977–present

References

External links
Information about the Assistant Secretary of State for Consular Affairs by the State Department Historian
Bureau of Consular Affairs Website

 
1953 introductions
Visa policy of the United States
Immigration to the United States
Consular affairs